Whorl Mountain is a mountain in the northern part of Yosemite National Park, well north of Mount Conness, and barely inside the boundary of Yosemite. Whorl Mountain is the 22nd-highest mountain in Yosemite National Park.

On climbing Whorl Mountain
Whorl Mountain is a  climb.

Gallery

References

External links and references
 A topographic map of Whorl Mountain

Mountains of Yosemite National Park
Mountains of Tuolumne County, California
North American 3000 m summits
Mountains of Northern California
Sierra Nevada (United States)